"It's Alright" is the debut single by Australian singer songwriter, Deni Hines. The song was released in October 1995 as the first single from her debut studio album, Imagination (1996). The single peaked at number 4 in Australia.

At the ARIA Music Awards of 1996, "It's Alright" won the award for 'Breakthrough Artist – Single'. her acceptance speech was: "I don't know, um, thanks and grouse!"

Track listing
 Australian Maxi single (D1236)
 "It's Alright" (7" Radio Mix) - 3:47
 "It's Alright" (D Influence Mix) - 4:18
 "It's Alright" (G Division Mix) - 4:22
 "It's Alright" (D Influence Extra Bits)	- 4:12

 European CD single 
 "It's Alright"(D-Influence Radio Edit) - 3:29
 "It's Alright" (Don-E Radio Edit)	- 3:55

Charts

Weekly charts

Year-end charts

Certifications

References

External links
 Deni Hines "It's Alright" at Discogs

ARIA Award-winning songs
1995 songs
1995 debut singles
Mushroom Records singles
Songs written by Michelle Lewis